Harrogate is the largest city in Claiborne County, Tennessee, United States.  It is adjacent to Cumberland Gap National Historical Park.

The community has been known as "Harrogate" since the 19th century, but did not incorporate by that name until 1993. As of the 2010 census, its population was 4,389. It is considered a college town with Lincoln Memorial University's main campus located entirely within Harrogate.

Before incorporation, the United States Census Bureau treated Harrogate as a census-designated place (CDP) called Harrogate-Shawanee. At the time of the 2000 census the CDP had a population of 2,865.

Geography

Harrogate is located at  (37.811324, -82.806780).

The unincorporated community of Shawanee, is located east inside of the city limits of Harrogate.

History
In 1974, the population of Harrogate continued to grow at a fast pace, leading to the construction of a new middle school serving both students of Harrogate and the adjacent town of Cumberland Gap. In 1993, Harrogate was incorporated into a city, and continued to see the fastest population growth of all in Claiborne County. Lincoln Memorial University saw growth as new dorms, an athletic arena, new classrooms, a medical program, and a partnership with Japan's Kanto International Senior High School enhanced the Harrogate campus.

By the late 2000s, the city would construct a sewage treatment system following increased contaminations of groundwater and instances of human waste surfacing from failing septic tank systems.

Demographics

CDP

As of the census of 2000, there were 2,865 people, 1,032 households, and 747 families residing in the Harrogate-Shawanee CDP. The population density was 688.3 inhabitants per square mile (265.9/km2). There were 1,091 housing units at an average density of 262.1 per square mile (101.3/km2). The racial makeup of the CDP was 94.73% White, 0.94% African American, 0.42% Native American, 0.94% Asian, 0.17% from other races, and 2.79% from two or more races. Hispanics or Latinos of any race were 0.52% of the population.

There were 1,032 households, out of which 27.5% had children under the age of 18 living with them, 56.4% were married couples living together, 12.8% had a female householder with no husband present, and 27.6% were non-families. 23.2% of all households were made up of individuals, and 9.9% had someone living alone who was 65 years of age or older. The average household size was 2.40 and the average family size was 2.83.

The age distribution was 20.5% under 18, 14.7% from 18 to 24, 24.2% from 25 to 44, 25.1% from 45 to 64, and 15.6% who were 65 or older. The median age was 38 years. For every 100 females, there were 84.7 males. For every 100 females age 18 and over, there were 83.2 males.

The median income for a household in the CDP was $34,227, and the median income for a family was $44,492. Males had a median income of $36,000 versus $25,036 for females. The per capita income for the CDP was $15,585. About 7.2% of families and 20.2% of the population were below the poverty line, including 17.0% of those under age 18 and 5.5% of those age 65 or over.

City
When Harrogate first incorporated the city population was approximately 2,700, but since that time the population has increased as a result of annexations. As of 2003, the United States Census Bureau estimated the city population at 3,974. In 2006 the estimated population was 4,425, making Harrogate the largest city in Claiborne County.

2020 census

As of the 2020 United States census, there were 4,400 people, 1,678 households, and 1,039 families residing in the city.

Education and culture
Lincoln Memorial University, a private four-year co-educational liberal arts college founded in 1897, is located in Harrogate. Its Abraham Lincoln Library and Museum houses a large collection of memorabilia relating to the school's namesake, Abraham Lincoln and the Civil War. Lincoln Memorial is the parent institution of the Debusk College of Osteopathic Medicine, the first osteopathic medical school in Tennessee.

Public schools in Harrogate are Ellen Myers Elementary, H.Y. Livesay Middle School, and Forge Ridge Consolidated School.

Cumberland Gap High School is located in Harrogate but has a Cumberland Gap address.  This is also where Tri-State Christian Academy is located.

The town's Daniel Boone Arboretum contains over 50 labeled species of native trees.

Town twinning

  Harrogate, United Kingdom

References

Further reading

 Sweet, Natalie. Harrogate and Cumberland Gap. (Arcadia Publishing, 2014).

External links

Claiborne County Chamber of Commerce

 
Cities in Tennessee
Former census-designated places in Tennessee
Cities in Claiborne County, Tennessee
1993 establishments in Tennessee